Squid The Whale (formerly known as No, Really!) is an indie pop-rock band from Metro Detroit, Michigan. Formed in 2008, it originally consisted of vocalist Robert Weber, guitarist Brandon Kubiac, bassist Daniel Jay Mataczynski and drummer Jonathan Wagoner.

In 2010, they released their debut album A Worrisome Voyage Through Inclement Weather. The following year, Robert Weber departed from the band and Bradley Walden joined in his place. Together, they went on to release their first EP new war. (2011), and singles Rolling In The Deep (Adele) and The German Affair (2012). In 2013, they released the second EP Four More.

Six months later, it was announced that Bradley Walden would be leaving Squid The Whale and would soon after join as the new lead vocalist for the post-hardcore band Emarosa.

In 2015, they released the EP B-Sides, which includes 3 previously unreleased songs.

References

Musical groups from Detroit